The Phillips New Testament in Modern English (complete title: The New Testament in Modern English) (Phi) is an English translation of the New Testament of the Bible translated by Anglican clergyman J. B. Phillips first published in 1958.

BibleGateway.com describes the translation as "up-to-date and forceful involving the reader in the dramatic events and powerful teaching of the New Testament. It brings home the message of Good News as it was first heard two thousand years ago."

See also
Four Prophets, a 1963 rendering by Phillips of the Books of Amos, Hosea, First Isaiah and Micah.

References

External links
 Complete 1961 edition text online

See also

1958 books
Bible translations into English
1958 in Christianity
New Testament editions